George Cummings Brown Jr. (May 15, 1923 – September 12, 2008) was an American football player.  He was elected to the College Football Hall of Fame in 1985.

References

George Brown's obituary

1923 births
2008 deaths
Navy Midshipmen football players
San Diego State Aztecs football players
College Football Hall of Fame inductees